PX Sports  (Primero Action Sports Television) is a Spanish-language pay television channel that focuses on music, lifestyle and extreme action sports related programming including live and pre-recorded events such as surfing, skateboarding, MMA, motocross, drifting, and snowboarding.

PXTV was founded in April 2011 and headquartered in Mexico City. The sports network boasts over 500 hours of original programming in collaboration with production houses such as Blue Print.
The network is currently broadcasting in Latin America in countries such as Mexico on Totalplay channel 528, Megacable channel 318, Cablecom channel  222, Ultravision channel 407, and Cablevision Monterrey on channel 310. PXTV broadcasts in Colombia on TIGO channel 252, and on HV Multiplay channel 13. It also broadcasts in the United States with AT&T Uverse on channel 3122  with a recent launch on TV Everywhere. In July 2016, Olympusat added the channel to its OTT platform, VEMOX.

In January 2017, the channel was renamed to PX Sports.

References

Television stations in Mexico
Television channels and stations established in 2011
Spanish-language television stations